Inocoterone acetate (developmental code names RU-38882, RU-882) is a steroid-like nonsteroidal antiandrogen (NSAA) that was developed for topical administration to treat acne but was never marketed. It is the acetate ester of inocoterone, which is less potent in comparison. Inocoterone acetate is actually not a silent antagonist of the androgen receptor but rather a weak partial agonist, similarly to steroidal antiandrogens like cyproterone acetate.

Inocoterone acetate was investigated for the treatment of acne but showed only modest (albeit statistically significant) efficacy in clinical trials. A reduction of 26% of lesions was observed in males treated with the drug after 16 weeks (~3.7 months). However, this is notably far less than that achieved with other agents such as benzoyl peroxide or antibiotics, which produce 50–75% reductions within 2 months. Similar poor results with the topical route have disappointingly been found for other antiandrogens such as cyproterone acetate and spironolactone. Similarly to rosterolone, inocoterone acetate has no systemic antiandrogenic activity when applied systemically.

See also
 Steroidal antiandrogen
 List of steroidal antiandrogens

References

Acetate esters
Anti-acne preparations
Enones
Three-membered rings
Nonsteroidal antiandrogens